The Woman in Black is a 2012 horror film directed by James Watkins from a screenplay by Jane Goldman. It is the second adaptation of Susan Hill's 1983 novel of the same name, which was previously filmed in 1989. The film stars Daniel Radcliffe, Ciarán Hinds, Janet McTeer, Sophie Stuckey, and Liz White. The plot, set in early 20th-century England, follows a young recently widowed lawyer who travels to a remote village where he discovers that the vengeful ghost of a scorned woman is terrorising the locals.

The film was produced by Hammer Film Productions, Alliance Films, Cross Creek Pictures and the UK Film Council. A film adaptation of Hill's novel was announced in 2009, with Goldman and Watkins attached to the project. During July 2010, Radcliffe was cast in the lead role of Arthur Kipps. The film was meant to be shot in 3D before those plans were scrapped. Principal photography took place from September to December 2010 across England. Post-production lasted until June 2011. It attracted controversy after receiving a 12A certificate from the British Board of Film Classification, despite several cuts being made.

The Woman in Black premiered at the Royal Festival Hall in London before being theatrically released in North America on 3 February 2012 by CBS Films and Alliance Films and in the United Kingdom on 10 February 2012 by Momentum Pictures. The film received generally positive reviews with critics praising Radcliffe's performance, cinematography, direction, atmosphere and homages to Hammer's gothic horror films, calling it a "solid ghost story". It was also commercially successful, grossing $130 million worldwide.

A sequel, The Woman in Black: Angel of Death, was released on 2 January 2015, without the involvement of Radcliffe, Watkins or Goldman.

Plot
In the English village of Crythin Gifford in 1889, three young girls playing in their nursery notice a presence in the room; appearing entranced, they all jump to their deaths from the window.

In 1906, in Edwardian London, lawyer Arthur Kipps's son Joseph is born, but his wife, Stella, dies after childbirth. Four years later, Arthur is instructed to visit Crythin Gifford to retrieve any documents left by Alice Drablow, the deceased owner of Eel Marsh House, an isolated and desolate estate on the marshland, as a prelude to the sale of the house. Upon arrival, Arthur finds the villagers cold and unwelcoming, though he finds sympathy in wealthy local landowner Samuel Daily.

Arthur meets Mr. Jerome, who tries to hurry him away from the village. Undeterred, he travels to Eel Marsh House. There, he is distracted by odd noises, a bolted nursery, and a spectral entity in black funerary garb. He hears sounds on the marshes of a carriage and a screaming child but sees nobody on the causeway. He tries to alert the village constable, who dismisses his concerns. Two children enter the station with their sister Victoria, who has ingested lye, but she collapses in Arthur’s arms and succumbs to death. The townspeople blame Arthur.

That night, Sam reveals that he and his wife, Elisabeth, lost their young son to drowning. Upon Arthur’s return to Jerome’s office, he discovers Jerome’s young daughter barricaded in the basement. She angrily rebuffs his attempt to help her, as she, too, believes him to be responsible for Victoria’s death. Sam attempts to take Arthur to Eel Marsh, but a gang of local men try to block them. Victoria's father tearfully accuses Arthur of seeing "that woman" at Eel Marsh.

At the house, Arthur uncovers correspondence between Alice and her sister Jennet Humfrye. Jennet demands to see her son Nathaniel whom the Drablows have formally adopted and barred her from contacting due to her being mentally unfit to look after him, which she denies. A death certificate reveals Nathaniel drowned in a carriage accident on the marsh. Jennet blames Alice for saving only herself and leaving Nathaniel to drown. Another death certificate shows that Jennet hanged herself in the nursery, vowing never to forgive Alice. Arthur hears noises from the nursery, now unlocked. From the window, he sees a boy crawling out of the ground and walking towards the house. He goes outside and sees dead children in the marshes, Victoria among them. Inside, he sees an apparition of a woman hanging herself.

Sam picks Arthur up the next morning. In town, Jerome's house catches fire with his daughter still inside. When Arthur attempts to save her, he sees the Woman in Black goading the girl into burning herself. The townspeople blame Arthur for this death as well. Elisabeth tells Arthur that the Woman in Black is Jennet, who claims the village children by having them take their own lives in penance for her own son being taken from her. Arthur realizes that his son Joseph, who is coming to Crythin Gifford that night, is Jennet's next victim.

In an effort to lift the curse, Arthur and Sam find Nathaniel's body in the marsh and place it in his nursery, where Arthur lures Jennet to him. They bury Nathaniel with Jennet, though her voice echoes through the house that she will never forgive the wrongs she suffered. Assuming that Jennet has been pacified, Arthur meets Joseph and his nanny at the railway station. While bidding farewell to Sam, Arthur sees the Woman in Black lure Joseph onto the tracks. Attempting to save him, both he and Joseph are killed by the oncoming train. The horrified Sam sees the ghosts of all the village children who were killed standing with the Woman in Black.

On the tracks, Arthur and Joseph, now transitioned to the next life, are met by Stella in a peaceful and bright train station. The family is happily reunited as the Woman in Black looks on.

Cast

Liz White's character is never referred to as "The Woman in Black" inside the film or during the credits, where she is listed as "Jennet".

Production

Development
The film was announced in 2009, with Jane Goldman as screenwriter and later James Watkins as director. Daniel Radcliffe was announced as the actor playing the part of Arthur Kipps on 19 July 2010. Two months later, it was announced that Harry Potter and the Deathly Hallows – Part 2 co-star Ciarán Hinds would join Radcliffe along with Janet McTeer as Mr and Mrs Daily respectively. Before filming, Radcliffe saw a psychologist so he could better understand his character. The part of Joseph Kipps was played by Misha Handley, who is Radcliffe's real life godson.

Filming
The film was planned to be shot in 3D, but the idea was later scrapped. Principal photography officially started on 26 September 2010. The next day, Radcliffe was pictured in costume just outside Peterborough, England. In early October the crew was filming in Layer Marney Tower. Filming officially ended on 4 December 2010.

The exterior shots of Eel Marsh House were filmed at Cotterstock Hall near Oundle in central England. The fictional Nine Lives Causeway leading to it was filmed at Osea Island in Essex. The village of Crythin Gifford was filmed at Halton Gill, north of Settle in the Yorkshire Dales.

Post-production
At the Kapow! Comic Con in London during April 2011, director James Watkins confirmed filming had been completed in December 2010 and post-production would go on until June 2011.  For its British release, several changes were made in order to qualify for a 12A certificate: Momentum Pictures, the distributor, arranged to have six seconds cut and for changes to other shots, with some scenes darkened and the sound level reduced on some others.

Despite the cuts, the 12A certificate was seen as highly controversial in the United Kingdom, and the British Board of Film Classification received 134 complaints from individuals that the rating was too low, the most complained-about film of 2012 according to BBFC figures. A cinematic re-release in October 2014, including a short clip from the forthcoming sequel The Woman in Black: Angel of Death, was given a higher rating of 15.

Music

The soundtrack for the film was composed by American film composer Marco Beltrami. It received positive reviews and was released as a soundtrack album on 12 March 2012 by Silva Screen Records.

Release and reception

Critical reception
The Woman in Black was met with generally positive reviews from critics. On Rotten Tomatoes, the film holds a rating of 66%, based on 195 reviews, with an average rating of 6.10/10. The site's critical consensus states, "Traditional to a fault, The Woman in Black forwent gore for chills—although it may not provide enough of them for viewers attuned to modern, high-stakes horror." On Metacritic the film has a score of 62 out of 100, based on 40 critics, indicating "generally favorable reviews".

Box office
During opening weekend, The Woman in Black earned $20 million, the biggest US opening for a Hammer film in all of Hammer history, putting it at second place in the box office, behind Chronicle, which earned about $1 million more. This is significantly more than the $11–$16.5 million industry analysts predicted it would bring in. By June 2012, The Woman in Black had made $127.7 million worldwide. The film also became the highest-grossing British horror film in 20 years.

Home media
The film was released on DVD and Blu-ray Disc on 18 June 2012 in the United Kingdom, and was released in the United States on 22 May 2012.

Sequel

In April 2012, Hammer Films announced that there would be a sequel to The Woman in Black, which is titled The Woman in Black: Angel of Death. The official plot synopsis is: "During World War II, the London bombings force schoolteachers Eve Parkins (Phoebe Fox) and Jean Hogg (Helen McCrory) to evacuate a group of children to Crythin Gifford. When the refugees take shelter at Eel Marsh House, Eve soon comes to realise that they are not alone. The longer they remain there, the more the house's evil spirit threatens the children. With the help of a pilot (Jeremy Irvine), Eve tries to protect the children and uncover the truth of the Woman in Black."

The original novel's author Susan Hill helped with the story, with the screenplay written by Jon Croker. In October 2012, Tom Harper was announced as the film's director. In April 2013, it was announced that Jeremy Irvine will play the lead role with rumors of Daniel Radcliffe briefly reprising his role from the first film, however Radcliffe ultimately did not appear in the sequel. It later was announced that Phoebe Fox and Helen McCrory had been cast in the film as well. The film began the shooting process in early 2014.

The film was released on 2 January 2015 to moderate box office returns but a generally negative critical response.

See also

2012 in film
List of British films of 2012
List of ghost films

 Osea Island (causeway location)

References

Further reading
 Grunert, Andrea. "The Woman in Black". Enzyklopädie des Phantastischen Films. Issue 97, Meitingen: Corian Verlag. March 2012. p. 1–19. .

External links

2012 horror thriller films
2010s historical horror films
Films about mind control
2012 films
American supernatural horror films
2012 horror films
Alliance Films films
British haunted house films
British horror thriller films
British historical horror films
Canadian horror thriller films
English-language Canadian films
Cross Creek Pictures films
Exclusive Media films
Films about suicide
Films about child death
Films based on British horror novels
Films set in 1889
Films set in 1906
Films set in 1910
Films set in country houses
Films set in Yorkshire
Films scored by Marco Beltrami
Films produced by Brian Oliver
Hammer Film Productions horror films
2010s ghost films
Gothic horror films
Rating controversies in film
Films with screenplays by Jane Goldman
Swedish horror films
Swedish thriller films
English-language Swedish films
Supernatural drama films
2010s psychological horror films
British ghost films
British supernatural horror films
Canadian supernatural horror films
CBS Films films
Period horror films
2010s English-language films
Films directed by James Watkins
2010s Canadian films
2010s American films
2010s British films
2010s Swedish films
Horror film remakes